Paris Kills is the sixth studio album by Finnish rock band The 69 Eyes. It was released in 2002 on Gaga Goodies / Poko Rekords and re-released in 2007 on Cleopatra Records. The first single from the album was "Dance d'Amour".

Track listing
 "Crashing High" – 3:54
 "Dance d'Amour" – 3:56
 "Betty Blue" (feat. Ville Valo) – 3:37
 "Grey" – 4:16
 "Radical" – 3:52
 "Don't Turn Your Back on Fear" – 3:45
 "Stigmata" (feat. Ville Valo) – 4:23
 "Forever More" – 4:10
 "Still Waters Run Deep" (feat. Ville Valo) – 4:10
 "Dawn's Highway" – 6:08

Bonus tracks
 "You're Lost Little Girl" – 4:42
 "Crashing High" (Remix) – 3:55
 "Stigmata" (Gothic Mix) – 6:14

Enhanced part – Russian edition
 "Betty Blue" (video)
 "Dance d'Amour" (video)

Singles
Dance d'Amour
"Dance d'Amour"
"You're Lost Little Girl"

Betty Blue
"Betty Blue"
"Grey" (Radio Live)
"Don't Turn Your Black on Fear" (Radio Live)

Crashing High
"Crashing High"
"Stigmata (Gothic) Remix"
"Stigmata (Demonic) Remix"
"Stigmata (Prophecy) Remix"

The 69 Eyes albums
2002 albums